Ian Kennedy (born 1984) is a baseball player.

Ian Kennedy or Iain Kennedy may also refer to:

Ian Kennedy (comics) (19322022), UK comic artist
Ian Kennedy (legal scholar) (born 1941), British academic lawyer

Iain Kennedy (born 1985), Scottish rugby union player
Iain Kennedy (cricketer) (born 1960), Scottish cricketer
Iain Kennedy (rower) (born 1950), Irish rower